The 2014 Libertarian National Convention was a biennial convention of the Libertarian Party that was held in Columbus, Ohio from Thursday June 26 to Sunday June 29, 2014.

Nicholas Sarwark of Denver was elected Chair of the Libertarian National Committee.

References

External links
 / Convention Website

Libertarian Party (United States) National Conventions
Libertarian National Convention
21st century in Columbus, Ohio
Political conventions in Ohio
June 2014 events in the United States